

See also
 List of massacres in Yugoslavia

Serbia
Serbia history-related lists
 
Lists of events in Serbia